Playland may refer to:

Entertainment venues
Playland (Fresno), an amusement park in Fresno, California, U.S.
Playland (New York), an amusement park in Rye, New York, U.S.
Playland (Vancouver), an amusement park in Vancouver, British Columbia, U.S.
Playland (San Francisco), a former amusement park in San Francisco, California, U.S.
Playland Café, a historic gay bar in Boston, Massachussets, U.S.
Dodge Park Playland, a former amusement park in Council Bluffs, Iowa, U.S.
Rockaways' Playland, a former amusement park in Queens, New York, U.S.
Playland-Not-At-The-Beach, a non-profit museum in El Cerrito, California, U.S.
Playland's Castaway Cove, an amusement park in Ocean City, New Jersey, U.S.

Other uses
Playland (album), a 2014 album by Johnny Marr
Playland, a companion comic to Pippin published by Polystyle Publications
Playland, a 1994 novel by John Gregory Dunne

See also

Playland Park (disambiguation)